The Crystal Palace transmitting station, officially known as Arqiva Crystal Palace, is a broadcasting and telecommunications site in the Crystal Palace area of the London Borough of Bromley, England. It is located on the site of the former television station and transmitter operated by John Logie Baird from 1933.

The station is the eighth-tallest structure in London, and is best known as the main television transmitter for the London area. As such, it is the most important transmitter in the UK in terms of population covered. The transmitter is owned and operated by Arqiva.

History and development

The station was constructed in the mid-1950s among the ruins of the Crystal Palace. The Aquarium on whose site it stands was destroyed in 1941 during the demolition of the Palace's north water tower. (John Logie Baird's earlier transmitter and TV studios were a separate development at the other end of the Palace and perished with it in 1936.) Its new  tower was the tallest structure in London until the topping-out of One Canada Square at Canary Wharf in 1990.

The first transmission from Crystal Palace took place on 28 March 1956, when it succeeded the transmitter at Alexandra Palace where the BBC had started the world's first scheduled television service in November 1936. In November 1956 the first colour test transmissions began from Crystal Palace, relaying live pictures from the studios at Alexandra Palace after BBC TV had closed down for the night. In May 1958 the first experimental Band V 625-line transmissions started from Crystal Palace.

This tower was designed and built for BBC by British Insulated Callender's Construction Co. Ltd., with steelwork fabrication by Painter Brothers Ltd. of Hereford. At the time, a 16mm film of the construction by BICC was produced; this was available on loan from the BICC Film Library.

Innovations
The transmitter was the first in the UK to broadcast (experimentally) on 625 lines (UHF) in 1962–1964, which it did on Channel 44, using a modified version of the SMPTE optical monochrome test card (not to be confused with the SMPTE colour bars).

On 18 July 1986, with the First Night of the Proms on BBC2, the transmitter became the first in the world to transmit stereophonic sound using the NICAM digital sound system.

Television

When built it transmitted BBC Television on the VHF 405-line system; the Croydon transmitter two miles away had been built some months earlier to broadcast ITV. When UHF transmissions started in 1964, first the new BBC2 and later both BBC 1 and ITV (Rediffusion weekdays and ATV London at weekends) were transmitted from Crystal Palace. Thames Television began in 1968 along with London Weekend which became London Weekend Television (LWT) in 1978. 405-line VHF television was discontinued at the start of 1985, and from then onwards all television broadcasts from Crystal Palace were only on UHF.

Crystal Palace did not transmit analogue Channel 5: this (alone) came from Croydon. Croydon had reserve transmitters for ITV and Channel 4, used in the event of a fault or maintenance at Crystal Palace. The BBC decided that a complete reserve was also a good idea and all four services became available from Croydon if required.

The station carried the London regions of BBC ONE, BBC TWO, ITV1 and Channel 4 in analogue, each with an effective radiated power of 1 MW, before the digital switchover took place during April 2012, as well as all six digital terrestrial television multiplexes. These had an ERP of 20 kW before switchover and 200 kW after, with considerable beam tilt to the south and east. With digital switchover completed all services come from Crystal Palace again, but because of the site's importance Croydon will be able to duplicate the PSB multiplexes in case of emergency. Although DTT requires far less power to achieve the same coverage as analogue TV, this 17 dB difference is too large to ensure comparable coverage.

Radio
It is also used for FM radio transmission of local radio stations BBC Radio London, Radio X, Capital Xtra and Absolute Radio, and a low-powered relay of the four BBC national FM services - Radio 1, Radio 2, Radio 3 and Radio 4, and Classic FM. It also has medium wave transmitters on 558 kHz (Panjab Radio), 720 kHz (BBC Radio 4) and 1035 kHz (Kismat Radio). Since the tower is grounded, a wire aerial span close to it is used for the MW services.

Since 1995 the tower has been one of five London transmitters for the BBC DAB multiplex. This was joined in 1999 by the Digital One DAB service, and a further local DAB multiplex has since started transmitting, on behalf of the Klarna shopping channel.

High definition
In May 2006 it began broadcasting the first terrestrial HDTV signals in the UK to a trial group of 450 London homes to test HD broadcasts by the BBC, ITV, Channel 4 and Channel 5, to assess the viability and potential problems of future nationwide HD broadcasting. On 2 December 2009 the site entered service as one of the first DVB-T2 transmitters in the world, carrying a variant of the BBC's Multiplex B broadcasting high-definition TV services.

Digital switchover
The Government's plans for digital switchover were based on the use of almost all current analogue TV transmitter sites. Crystal Palace remained a key part of the network after analogue was switched off in the London area in April 2012. In July 2007 it was confirmed by Ofcom that Crystal Palace would remain an A group transmitter after DSO (digital switchover). This was partially reversed with the 700 MHz Clearance that resulted in the use of Channels 55 and 56 for digital television both outside the A Group.

The transmitter is only one of two (the other being the ITV Granada transmitter at Winter Hill) that alone provides ITV and BBC services for the whole of their region, although still supported by the usual network of relays. Between opening in 1974 and January 1982, the main transmitter at Bluebell Hill broadcast ITV London signals to much of north and central Kent. However, the Independent Broadcasting Authority (IBA), the then regulator of commercial television, reorganised the ITV franchises which saw Bluebell Hill transferred to a new south and south-east dual-region of ITV (Television South – TVS), which took effect from 1 January 1982. Bluebell Hill now transmits ITV Meridian and BBC ONE South East.

As one would expect for the largest transmitter in the country – by population coverage – Crystal Palace transmitter, remained an A group, (which was its original analogue group) both during dual running (analogue & low power pre-DSO digital) and full power digital after DSO. However, in March 2018, during the transmitters 700 MHz clearance, the temporary MUXES 7 and 8 were moved out of group to CH55 and CH56. Thus, reception of the latter two MUXES now requires a wideband or K group aerial (see graph). MUXES 7 and 8 are, however, due to be switched off sometime before 2023.

On 18 April 2012, a public lighting display was performed from the tower to mark the last day of analogue TV broadcasts from the transmitter.

Channels listed by frequency

Analogue radio (AM medium wave)

These frequencies were used by Lots Road until Tuesday 25 September 2007.

Analogue radio (FM VHF)

† Relay of Wrotham.

Digital radio (DAB)

Digital television

After switchover

Before switchover

Analogue television
BBC2 analogue was shut down on UHF 33 on 4 April 2012, and ITV London was temporarily moved from UHF 23 into BBC2's frequency of UHF 33. The remaining  analogue services shut down on 18 April 2012.

See also

 List of radio stations in the United Kingdom
 List of tallest buildings and structures in Great Britain
 List of tallest towers in the world
 List of famous transmission sites
 Radio masts and towers
 Lattice tower

References

Bibliography
Burns, R. W., British Television: The Formative Years, IET (1986), 
Evans, R. H., The Crystal Palace FM filler experiment, British Broadcasting Corporation, Division of Engineering, Research and Development Department (1996), ASIN B0018RJ1ZY

External links

The Transmission Gallery: Crystal Palace Transmitter photographs and information
Pictures and info on Crystal Palace, including co-receivable transmitters

Crystal Palace Transmitter at thebigtower.com
Pictures (including inside the transmitter buildings) at The Triangle

Lattice towers
Buildings and structures in the London Borough of Bromley
Crystal Palace, London
History of television in the United Kingdom
Infrastructure in London
Radio in the United Kingdom
Television in the United Kingdom
Transmitter sites in England
Media and communications in the London Borough of Bromley